Michauxia is a genus of plants in the family Campanulaceae. It contains 7 known species native to southwestern Asia.

 Michauxia campanuloides L'Hér. - Turkey, Syria, Lebanon, Palestine, Israel
 Michauxia koeieana Rech.f. - Iran
 Michauxia laevigata Vent. - Caucasus, Iran, Iraq, Turkey
 Michauxia nuda A.DC. in A.P.de Candolle - Turkey, Syria, Lebanon, Iraq
 Michauxia stenophylla Boiss. & Hausskn. in P.E.Boissier - Iran
 Michauxia tchihatcheffii Fisch. & C.A.Mey. - Turkey
 Michauxia thyrsoidea Boiss. & Heldr. in P.E.Boissier  - Turkey

Medicinal properties
Several species of Michauxia - notably M. nuda and M. tchihatcheffii - are used in the treatment of wounds in Turkish folk medicine.
Recent scientific evaluation has confirmed that these plants possess wound-healing, anti-inflammatory and antioxidant properties.

References

Campanuloideae
Campanulaceae genera